The rufous-crested tanager (Creurgops verticalis) is a species of bird in the family Thraupidae.
It is found in Colombia, Ecuador, Peru and Venezuela.
Its natural habitat is subtropical or tropical moist montane forests.

References

rufous-crested tanager
Birds of the Colombian Andes
Birds of the Ecuadorian Andes
Birds of the Peruvian Andes
rufous-crested tanager
rufous-crested tanager
Taxonomy articles created by Polbot